Thalía is the ninth studio album and third eponymous album by Mexican recording artist Thalía, released on July 8, 2003 by Virgin Records and EMI Latin. It is her first English-language album, and shares a title with Thalía's 1990 and 2002 Spanish-language albums. The album had a moderate success selling 750,000 in three months of release.

Background and production
Since leaving the label Melody / Fonovisa for the label EMI in 1995, Thalía and her label have sought to reach a larger audience than what she achieved with her first three releases. Thalía's first English recordings would come in 1997 on an album titled Nandito Ako which was released exclusively in the Philippines and later certified 3× platinum there. After the successes of the albums En éxtasis and Amor a la Mexicana the EMI label planned a major investment in Thalía's career with her follow-up album Arrasando. In 2000, Los Angeles-based Jose Behar, president/CEO of EMI-Latin, told to Billboard that Thalía was "completely committed reaching the largest possible audience [in the US]" and  that "a pop crossover is part of the "ultimate plan" for Thalia, but "we're not rushing anything. Our intention is for things to evolve naturally." Some of Arrasando's songs were recorded in English and were listed on the singer's official website but they were not released commercially except for "It's My Party" (version of the song "Arrasando") which was released as a single and later added to the remix album Thalía's Hits Remixed and "Don't Close the Door" English version of "Regresa a mí". After English versions for her 2002's album Thalía, EMI finally decided to release an album completely in English which was seen at the time as a Thalía's crossover. The Latinity of her previous albums was left out and songs in the style of R&B and pop were selected. The album was finally released in 2003 and a CD+DVD special was also released.

Singles
Four singles were released from the album: "I Want You" was the first one and also the album's most popular song, peaking at number 22 on the Billboard Hot 100 and number seven in the Mainstream chart. It is her only song to date that has charted within the Billboard Hot 100. In Greece, the song peaked number twenty-five in Top 50 singles sales. The Spanish version of the song, "Me Pones Sexy" was released for the Spanish-languaged audience and also perform quite well on the Latin Charts, peaking within the top ten of the Hot Latin Tracks at number nine. "Baby, I'm in Love" was the second single, but performed poorly peaking only #46 in Greece. In Romania the song peaked at #77. The remixed version "The Boris & Beck, Norty Cotto Mixes" peaked at #12 in the Dance Music/Club Play Singles chart and #51 Billboard Hot Singles Sales. "Alguien Real", the Spanish version of the song, did not appear on any of the Latin Charts. The music video (of both English and Spanish version) was directed by Antti Jokinen, and it was shot at CBGB's on the Bowery on July 23, being published on September 20, 2003. In it, Thalía has fun with her friends, going out at night and playing the song in a club, representing the spirit of punk."Don't Look Back" was released as a remixed single and the "N. Cotto & J. Nevins Mixes" version, did well on Billboard Dance Charts, peaking at #9. "Cerca de Ti" wa the fourth single of the album, peaked at number one on the Hot Latin Tracks. "Closer to You", the English version of the song, was eventually cancelled, however it peaked at #4 on Billboard Bubbling Under Hot 100 Singles.

Critical reception

The album received mixed reviews from music critics. Johnny Loftus from AllMusic website wrote that the album "stylization in both sound and sight -- is more marketable than breaking new ground" and that it "is doubly disappointing, since its second half consists mostly of Spanish-language versions of the singles in its first half." Barry Walters from Rolling Stone magazine gave the album three out of five stars and claim that "unfortunately, Thalia's efforts to break the language barrier, make her meek and mute her charms".  Neil Drumming from Entertainment Weekly website gave the album a C and called it "unoriginal" and also criticized the fact that half of the songs are in Spanish.

Commercial performance
The Japanese release, retitled "I Want You", was certified Gold by the Recording Industry Association of Japan. The album entered the charts in South Korea with over 3,000 copies sold on its first week. In Mexico the album was certified Gold on November 17, 2003. Initially 400,000 of the album were shipped, and it sold 50,000 in the first week of release in United States till 2005, it sold 196,000 copies according to Nielsen SoundScan. However, after its debut on Billboard 200 at number 11, represented the highest rank by any Latin act in 2003 and the highest since Border Girl by Paulina Rubio on July 6, 2002 which also debuted at 11 and sold 56,000 copies.

After ten weeks at the Oricon charts in Japan, Thalía sold 200,000 copies there as of 2004. As of August 2003, the album sold 3,039 in South Korea according to the Gaon Music Chart. According to EMI Brasil the album had sold 750,000 copies after three months of release.

Track listing

Charts

Certifications and sales

Release history

Notes

References

Thalía albums
2003 debut albums
Albums produced by Ric Wake
Albums produced by Cory Rooney